Anca Mihaela Rombescu  (born 15 September 1985) is a Romanian handball player. She plays for the club İzmir Büyükşehir Belediyesi GSK and the Romania national team.

She played in her country for CS Tomis Constanţa (2005–2008) before she moved in 2009 to Turkey to join the Istanbul-based club Üsküdar Belediyespor playing in the Turkish Women's Handball Super League. In 2014, she transferred to Yenimahalle Bld. SK in Ankara.

References

1985 births
People from Drobeta-Turnu Severin
Romanian female handball players
Romanian expatriate sportspeople in Turkey
Expatriate handball players in Turkey
Üsküdar Belediyespor players
Yenimahalle Bld. SK (women's handball) players
Living people